Miguel Hernán Jiménez Aracena (born 12 December 1980) is a Chilean footballer who currently plays for Rangers in the Primera B de Chile as a goalkeeper.

Club career

Early career
Born in Coltauco, he began his football career at Cobreloa's youth set-up aged 15.

Lota Schwager
On 17 March 2007, he was a starter in the historical 2–2 away draw of Lota with Colo-Colo at Estadio Monumental David Arellano.

Ñublense
On 6 January 2011, he joined Primera División de Chile side Ñublense.

Huachipato
On 27 December 2012, it was confirmed that Huachipato —then freshly Chilean league champion— hired him to challenge the goal with keeper Nery Veloso.

Universidad de Chile
On 7 January 2015, it was reported that Jiménez was signed by Club Universidad de Chile. Then, two days later he was officially presented alongside Matías Rodríguez (club's idol) during a press conference.

On 8 March 2015, he debuted in a 1–0 away win over San Marcos de Arica at Carlos Dittborn Stadium, where he performed well.

Iberia
In mid-2016, he moved to Deportes Iberia from Los Ángeles, Chile (VII Region of Maule). He arrived there after have agreeing a two year deal with the mission to replace to goalkeeper Franco Cabrera.

Fernández Vial
On 9 February 2018, he was signed by third-tier team Arturo Fernández Vial for play the Segunda División Profesional de Chile under orders of the Argentinian coach Esteban Fuertes, former footballer who played in Chile.

Return to Ñublense
On 18 December 2018, it was reported by ANFP website that Jiménez returned to Ñublense to face the 2019 Primera B de Chile tournament.

Honours

Club
Deportes Iquique
 Primera B de Chile (1): 2010
 Copa Chile (1): 2010

Universidad de Chile
 Copa Chile (1): 2015
 Supercopa de Chile (1): 2015

References

External links
 
 

1980 births
Living people
People from Cachapoal Province
People from O'Higgins Region
Chilean footballers
Chilean Primera División players
Tercera División de Chile players
Primera B de Chile players
Segunda División Profesional de Chile players
Cobreloa footballers
General Velásquez footballers
Deportes Iberia footballers
C.D. Antofagasta footballers
Lota Schwager footballers
Deportes Iquique footballers
Ñublense footballers
C.D. Huachipato footballers
Universidad de Chile footballers
C.D. Arturo Fernández Vial footballers
Magallanes footballers
Deportes Magallanes footballers
Deportes Concepción (Chile) footballers
Association football goalkeepers